Thibaudeau may refer to:

People 
 Alfred Thibaudeau (1860–1926), Canadian politician, former senator from Quebec
 Antoine Claire Thibaudeau (1765–1854), French politician
 Colleen Thibaudeau (1925–2012), Canadian poet and short-story writer
 Jean Thibaudeau (1935–2013), French author
 Joseph-Rosaire Thibaudeau (1837–1909), Canadian businessman and politician, former senator from Quebec
 Gilles Thibaudeau (born 1963), Canadian ice hockey player
 Martin Thibaudeau, actor
 Yvann Thibaudeau (born 1973), Canadian cutter

It is also the given name of:
 Thibaudeau Rinfret (1879–1962), Canadian jurist and Chief Justice of Canada from 1944 to 1954

Places 
 Thibaudeau, Manitoba, Canada
 Thibaudeau railway station